There are two types of coal found in Pennsylvania: anthracite (the “hard coal” found in Northeastern Pennsylvania below the Allegheny Ridge southwest to Harrisburg; also called “stone coal”, “rock coal” in the 1800s) and bituminous (“soft coal”, found west of the Allegheny Front escarpment). Anthracite coal is a natural mineral with a high carbon and energy content that gives off light and heat (produced energy) when burned, making it useful as a fuel. It was possibly first used in Pennsylvania as a fuel in 1769, but its real history begins with a documented discovery near Summit Hill and the founding of the Lehigh Coal Mine Company in 1792 to sporadically send expeditions to the wilderness atop Pisgah Ridge to mine the deposits, mostly with notable lack of great success, over the next 22 years.

About 1790 the nation's first energy crisis became evident even in smaller towns: the forests needed for charcoal for smelting and other manufacturing, and stands of wood for heating fire wood were quickly vanishing, farther and farther from population centers. Transport of wood or an alternative fuel became very important to people, and bituminous was cheaper to import from England than 'chancy, unreliable' anthracite was to buy in Philadelphia. Suffering through British navy blockades through during the war, industrialist Josiah White set his mill supervisors the task of experimenting with anthracite to get to ignite and burn in a useful way. Draft control and reflected heat proved to be the key to using anthracite for all processes. With sufficient heat, which excess air flow retards and cools, the fuel ignited and burned well. Soon other measures were found that within a decade made it the preferred home heating fuel in all the developed and settled East coast.

Industrialists Hazard and White showed the way. The developments of the canal and then railroad system made transporting the anthracite exponentially easier, and by the 1860s anthracite coal was regularly supplying urban centers like Philadelphia and New York City and was helping to fuel the American Industrial Revolution.

Geology 
Anthracite and bituminous coal were formed in the eastern and western regions of Pennsylvania respectively during the Pennsylvanian time in the Carboniferous Geological Period. The Pennsylvania Anthracite Region is in the Valley and Ridge Province of the Appalachian Mountains, with the coal located in the folded and faulted terrain of the Province.  The anthracite fields are maintained in synclinal basins that are surrounded by sandstone ridges, which help to “protect” the anthracite.  There are four different anthracite coalfields in Pennsylvania, all located on the eastern side of the state. The Northern field is located predominantly in the Luzerne, Lackawanna, Susquehanna and Wayne Counties; the Western Middle field in Northumberland, Columbia, and Schuylkill Counties; Eastern Middle field mainly in Luzerne County but extending into Schuylkill, Carbon, and Columbia Counties; the Southern field in Carbon, Schuylkill, Lebanon, and Dauphin Counties. Anthracite differs from bituminous in usage in that it has better heat quality and fewer disadvantageous by-products, but it has higher carbon content and is therefore harder to ignite and requires a grate to separate the ashes from the burning coal.

Early detection of coal 
One of the earliest mentions that coal might be found in the Pennsylvania area dates back to 1698, when Gabriel Thomas wrote an account dedicated to William Penn. He notes the possibility of coal because the running water had the same coloring as the water in the coalmines in Wales. The actual presence of coal is first recorded on a map made in 1753 by John Pattin, an Indian trader, although it is possible he did not detect the coal first hand, but rather heard about it from other traders.  Soon after, in 1754, George Washington led an expedition across the Allegheny Mountains, and his second-in-command wrote a letter detailing an abundance of natural luxuries including coal in the western region of Pennsylvania.  Then in 1761, the first actual Pennsylvania coalmine is recorded on the “Plan of Fort Pitts and Parts Adjacent” map. The bituminous mine was located in Fort Pitt near the top of Coal Hill, which is now downtown Pittsburgh. Anthracite coal was first found in 1762, and then was used for the first time around 1769 by Obadiah Gore and his brother in their blacksmith shop in Wilkes-Barre. However, coal usage was generally restricted to local consumption need until the industry began to expand at the turn of the 19th century.

Early history
The Lehigh Coal Mine Company first used coal commercially in 1792. The company was founded after German immigrant Philip Ginder discovered beds of the anthracite “stone coal” near Summit Hill in 1791 while out hunting. A wealthy landowner named Jacob Weiss provided the capital to form the Lehigh Coal Mine Company with other businessmen from Philadelphia. The company had a slow start because of the difficulty in igniting anthracite coal and the inability to transfer the coal to urban markets. Judge Jesse Fell of Wilkes-Barre discovered a solution to ignite anthracite in 1808 with the usage of an iron grate that allowed the coal to light and burn easier. Demand for the anthracite coal increased slightly. Brothers Abijah and John Smith were the first to successfully transport hard coal when they moved 50 tons on an ark down the Susquehanna River to Columbia in 1807.

War of 1812 
In 1810, 350 tons of anthracite was mined in Pennsylvania. The use of anthracite coal was restricted due to the difficulties in transporting it efficiently, and the industry was still small and undeveloped. The War of 1812 against Great Britain increased the usage of anthracite coal. Prior to the war, citizens of the nation's urban centers such as New York and Philadelphia received most of their coal fuel needs from Britain and Virginia's bituminous coal supplies. During the war the British blockade of American ports severely limited the supply of British bituminous fuel reaching the US, and there was also a shortage in Virginia's supply resulting in a fuel crisis. Before the war citizens did not like to use anthracite coal because it was difficult to ignite and maintain, but the wartime shortage forced them to start using anthracite. Jacob Cist of Wilkes-Barre promoted the use of anthracite during and after the War of 1812. Jacob Cist's father was a major investor in the Lehigh Coal Mine Company, so Cist began to transport the company's coal to Philadelphia by the Lehigh and Delaware Rivers. Once in Philadelphia, he used testimonials and public demonstrations to negate the stereotype of anthracite and convince Philadelphia society that the hard coal could be used as a replacement for bituminous coal. Cist and other advocates including the Pennsylvania state legislature and government officials continued to promote the anthracite, and the War of 1812 was able to open the way for Pennsylvania anthracite coal to outdo Virginia's bituminous share of the market.

Canals 
With the opening of the major canals Lehigh, Schuylkill, and Delaware & Hudson in addition to smaller ones such as the Delaware Division and Morris Canals, canal companies successfully provided urban markets for anthracite coal. The anthracite commercial market greatly expanded, and the hard coal was used as valuable fuel for heating and cooking domestically, as well as energy sources for small businesses such as blacksmiths, brewers, bakers, and manufacturers.

Lehigh Canal 
Joseph White and Erskine Hazard founded the Lehigh Navigation Company in 1818. They wanted to use rivers to more efficiently transport anthracite coal. After they were declined a charter to the Schuylkill River, they tried to receive a charter for the Lehigh River. The Lehigh River was located near the Summit Hill Mine, which was mined and operated by the Lehigh Coal Mine Company. Joseph White and Erskine Hazard made a partnership between their company and the Lehigh Coal Mine Company to form the Lehigh Coal & Navigation Company, which was incorporated in 1822. They received a charter from the Pennsylvania legislature giving them the right to improve navigation on the Lehigh River, which effectively granted them a monopoly over the Lehigh. White and Hazard ordered the construction of a roadway to link the Summit Hill Mine and the Lehigh River, and then ordered the building of a canal. By 1840, over 250,000 tons of anthracite mined from the region annually reached Philadelphia through White and Hazard's Lehigh River system.

Schuylkill Canal 
A group of Germans wanted to seek the rights to the Schuylkill River. They received a charter in 1815 to incorporate the Schuylkill Navigation Company, which would have control over the Schuylkill River. After receiving investors the Schuylkill Navigation Company was able to finance a 108-mile long river and canal system that connected the Pottsville area to Philadelphia that opened in 1825. By the early 1840s, some 500,000 tons of anthracite coal was being transported annually to Philadelphia using the Schuylkill River.

Delaware & Hudson Canal 
The Wurts brothers, William and Maurice, owned coalfields in the northeastern Pennsylvania anthracite region, but found an unresponsive market in Philadelphia, which was receiving coal from the Schuylkill and Lehigh routes. They saw business potential in finding a connection route between anthracite fields and the New York City market, and so they had the Delaware and Hudson Canal Company incorporated in 1823. The D&H Company built a canal system across parts of the Delaware and Hudson Rivers that stretched from Honesdale, PA to Rondout, NY, which was completed in 1828.

Railway
The rise of the railway system expanded the anthracite coal industry. The D&H Company was one of the first to attempt the use of steam locomotives in America. They purchased a locomotive from England so they could transport coal from the mines to their canal, and tested it on a railroad track in 1829. The locomotive ultimately failed, as it was too heavy for the wooden track, but demand was sparked for lighter locomotives that could transport coal from the mines to the canals. Locomotives that solely transported coal from mines to canal entries were in use in the 1830s, but goals were set to use railroads to bypass canals all together. In 1855 Asa Packer opened the Lehigh Valley Railroad (LVRR) to compete with the Lehigh Coal & Navigation Company's monopoly. The LVRR would eventually link the Mauch Chunk area of Pennsylvania all the way through New Jersey to NYC. The Philadelphia and Reading Railroad was opened in 1839 connecting Reading, PA in the southern anthracite region to Philadelphia. Through acquisitions it eventually went north to the Schuylkill field and east towards the Lehigh region. It faced competition with the Schuylkill Navigation Company, until the Reading Railroad eventually leased out the Schuylkill Navigation Company in 1870. The Delaware, Lackawanna & Western Railroad would become the major carrier of anthracite from the northern fields to NYC. While the extensive railroad systems made transporting more efficient, they also lowered the price of coal in distant markets such as Philadelphia and NYC relative to the prices in areas surrounding the mines. In 1840 the wholesale price of anthracite in Philadelphia relative to the mine price was 3.6, and by 1864 the ratio was 1.3. A similar drop occurred with the New York prices.

Iron industry
The usage of anthracite coal in the iron industry increased demand for hard coal. Since the late 18th century coke (bituminous coal with the impurities burned away) was used as fuel to make iron in Britain. With the spread of popularity of anthracite in the early 19th century, iron makers began experimenting with using anthracite as fuel in iron production. It wasn't until 1840 when David Thomas introduced Welsh hot blast technology to the Lehigh Crane Iron Company that anthracite was successfully used to smelt iron. It was indicated that using anthracite saved up to 25% in the production of iron, and that the quality of the iron was also superior. By the 1850s anthracite was used in the manufacture of about half of all crude iron produced in the US. The increased efficiency of anthracite heat was also instrumental in the manufacture of metal machinery and the transformation of water into steam for machinery power.

Civil War
The American Civil War created a shift in the makeup of the anthracite coal industry. Prior to the war, the industry involved many small-scale mines with short-term leases resulting in increasing production levels but an overall trend of falling prices. In 1830 anthracite coal was selling for $11 per ton, in 1840 it was $7 per ton, and by 1860 it was $5.50 a ton in NYC, while total production was increasing. This was due in part to a general anti-charter sentiment towards the coal industry by the Pennsylvania state government, making it difficult for coal corporations to receive charters,  as well as a seasonal market that experienced fluctuation in demand for anthracite. The onset of the war brought an increased need for fuel for the army, and in turn an expected increase in demand for coal. The boom of investment in the coal industry and predicted large-scale production of anthracite coal shifted the mentality of the Pennsylvania state government, and the legislature dramatically increased the number and quality of charters it granted to mining companies. Individual proprietors fell to the expansion of corporations who could master the large-scale production and efficient transportation that the wartime economy called for. The major railroad companies came to dominate the industry as they began to purchase coalfields in order to control both the production and shipping aspects. With increased concentration of capital among the smaller number of operations they were able to create deeper and deeper mining shafts to reach new levels of coal. By the end of the 19th century the Pennsylvania anthracite industry was controlled by a handful of major railroad corporations.

See also 
 Bootleg mining
 Coal mining in Northeastern Pennsylvania

Notes

References

Sources and further reading
 
 
 
 
 
 
 
 
 
 
 
 Monroe, Douglas Keith. "A Decade of Turmoil: John L. Lewis and the Anthracite Miners 1926-1936." (PhD dissrtation, Georgetown University; ProQuest Dissertations Publishing, 1977. 7722848).

External links 
 The Anthracite Heritage Museum. 
 Pennsylvania's Northern Coal Field 

Anthracite Coal Region of Pennsylvania
Anthracite
Anthracite
Anthracite
Anthracite
Anthracite
Anthracite Coal
History of the Lehigh Valley
History of mining in the United States
Energy history of the United States